Miroslav Čihák is a retired Czechoslovak slalom canoeist who competed in the 1950s. He won three medals at the ICF Canoe Slalom World Championships with a silver (C-2 team: 1959) and two bronzes (Mixed C-2: 1955, C-2 team: 1953).

References

Czech male canoeists
Czechoslovak male canoeists
Living people
Year of birth missing (living people)
Medalists at the ICF Canoe Slalom World Championships